The 18th BET Awards were held at Microsoft Theater in Los Angeles, California, on June 24, 2018. The ceremony celebrated achievements in entertainment and honors music, sports, television, and movies released between April 1, 2017 and March 31, 2018.

On May 22, 2018, it was announced that the ceremony would be hosted by Jamie Foxx for the second time. DJ Khaled and Kendrick Lamar were the most nominated act, with six nods. SZA with four nominations was the most nominated female artist of the ceremony.

Performers

Presenters

The first wave of presenters were announced on June 11, with the second wave announced on June 14.

 Kevin Hart
 LL Cool J
 Yvonne Orji
 Jason Mitchell
 Chloe x Halle
 Bobby Brown
 Trevor Jackson
 Jacob Latimore
 T.I.
 Gabrielle Dennis
 Woody McClain 
 Mike Colter
 Amandla Stenberg
 Tyler Perry
 Regina Hall
 Omari Hardwick
 Tika Sumpter
 SZA

Nominations
Winners highlighted in Bold

Special awards
Lifetime Achievement Award: Anita Baker
Humanitarian Award: Mamoudou Gassama (French)
Ultimate Icon Award: Debra L. Lee
Shine A Light Award: Brittnay Packnett

References

External links

BET Awards
2018 music awards
2018 awards
2018 awards in the United States